Contextual may refer to:
 Contextual advertising, advertisements based on other content displayed
 Contextual deep linking, links that bring users to content in mobile apps regardless of whether or not they had the app previously installed
 Contextual design, user-centered design process developed by Hugh Beyer and Karen Holtzblatt
 Contextual inquiry, user-centered design method, part of the contextual design methodology
 Contextual learning, learning outside the classroom
 Contextual theatre, form of theatre
 Comparative contextual analysis, methodology for comparative research

See also
Context (disambiguation)
Contextualization (disambiguation)